Daniel Lazard (born December 10, 1941) is a French mathematician and computer scientist. He is emeritus professor at Pierre and Marie Curie University.

Career 
Daniel Lazard was born in Carpentras, in southern France. His undergraduate education was at the École Normale Supérieure. Following graduate work at the École Normale Supérieure and the University of Paris, he was granted a doctorat d'état in 1968 by the University of Paris.  His dissertation was supervised by the commutative algebraist Pierre Samuel, and was titled "Autour de la platitude" ("Around flatness", or literally "Around the platitude").

After 1970, his main area of research changed to computer algebra, particularly multivariate polynomials,  computational algebraic geometry and systems of polynomial equations. To mark his retirement at the end of 2004, there was a conference at Pierre and Marie Curie University devoted to his subject area. In 2009, a special issue of the Journal of Symbolic Computation was published in his honor. To date, Lazard has authored or co-authored more than 40 journal articles, book chapters, conference papers, and other publications.

Selected articles

 .

References

External links 
 

1941 births
20th-century French mathematicians
21st-century French mathematicians
French computer scientists
Living people
Academic staff of Pierre and Marie Curie University
Algebraic geometers
People from Carpentras